Mohammad Reza Mirzaei Jaberi is a Paralympian athlete from Iran competing mainly in category F57 javelin events.

Mohammad Reza has competed in four Paralympics and has won the javelin in all four.  His first Paralympics came in Atlanta in 1996 where he won the F56 class, in 2000 and 2004 he won the F57 class then in Beijing in 2008 he won the combined F57/58 class.

External links
 

Paralympic athletes of Iran
Athletes (track and field) at the 1996 Summer Paralympics
Athletes (track and field) at the 2000 Summer Paralympics
Athletes (track and field) at the 2004 Summer Paralympics
Athletes (track and field) at the 2008 Summer Paralympics
Paralympic gold medalists for Iran
Living people
Medalists at the 1996 Summer Paralympics
Medalists at the 2000 Summer Paralympics
Medalists at the 2004 Summer Paralympics
Medalists at the 2008 Summer Paralympics
Year of birth missing (living people)
Paralympic medalists in athletics (track and field)
Iranian male javelin throwers
Wheelchair javelin throwers
Paralympic javelin throwers
21st-century Iranian people